Amy Hood (born August 9, 1971) is an American business executive serving as Chief Financial Officer of Microsoft since 2013. Hood is the first female CFO in Microsoft's history.

Hood joined Microsoft in 2002, holding positions in the investor relations group. She also served as chief of staff in the Server and Tools Business as well as running the strategy and business development team in the Business division. Previously, she worked at Goldman Sachs in various roles including investment banking and capital markets groups. On May 8, 2013, Microsoft announced Hood would be replacing Peter Klein as the company's chief financial officer. During her time at Microsoft, she helped orchestrate over 57 deals, including the $7.5 billion acquisition of GitHub in 2018. 

Hood holds a bachelor's degree in economics from Duke University in 1994 and an MBA from Harvard University. She and her husband are also minority owners of Major League Soccer's Seattle Sounders.

In 2013, she was #63 in the Forbes list of The World's 100 Most Powerful Women, and 2021, she was ranked #28 on the list.

References

External links 
 Microsoft bio

American women business executives
Chief financial officers
Duke University alumni
Harvard University alumni
Living people
Microsoft employees
Women corporate executives
1971 births